Grande Fratello 2 is the second season of the Italian version of the Reality television franchise Big Brother. The show was produced by Endemol and aired from 20 September 2001 to 20 December 2001.

Contestants

Nominations table

Notes
: The boys had to each vote to evict either Eleonora & Luana. Eleonora received the most evict votes and she was evicted. The girls had to each vote to evict either Giancarlo or Mathias. Giancarlo received the most evict votes and he was evicted. 
: Eleonora re-entered the house as a replacement for Luana. 
: For the final week, the public were voting to win, rather than to evict.

TV Ratings

References

2001 Italian television seasons
02